The Buxton Wonders was a small club of black baseball players formed in Buxton, Iowa running from approximately 1907 to 1920.

Buxton, Iowa was a company town founded by the Consolidation Coal Company in 1900. It remained a productive coal mining town until at least 1919. During many of those years, the company and town were host to the Buxton Wonders. The team also toured much of Iowa and the surrounding states.

In 1909, The Buxton Wonders won one game and lost one game in Buxton, Iowa against the Chicago Union Giants, facing pitchers, "the Lyons brothers" Jimmie Lyons and Bennie Lyons. The Wonders were one of few teams to beat the Chicago Union Giants that year, where the team won 46 out of 56 games played. The Union Giants appear to be regular visitors to Buxton's team.

George L. Neal, Richard S. Lee, Washington and Riley Sales are often listed as the managers of the Buxton Wonders, and list the team address as 34 East Fourth Street in Buxton, Iowa.

A partial team list includes:

In 1938, the Federal Writers Project Guide to Iowa reported that the site of Buxton was abandoned and that the locations of Buxton's former "stores, churches and schoolhouses are marked only by stakes."  Every September, hundreds of former Buxton residents met on the former town's site for a reunion.

The abandoned Buxton town was the subject of archaeological survey in the 1980s which investigated the economic and social aspects of material culture of African Americans in Iowa.

References

External links
"Seamheads.com" Buxton Wonders information for 1909

Negro league baseball teams
Sports in Iowa
Defunct baseball teams in Iowa
Monroe County, Iowa
Baseball teams disestablished in 1920
Baseball teams established in 1907